Nowicki (feminine: Nowicka; plural: Nowiccy) is a Polish and Jewish surname. It comes from place names such as Nowice, which are derived from the Polish adjective nowy ("new"). The surname is somewhat more frequent in central Poland. It has many forms in other languages.

People 
Nowicki may refer to:
 Andrzej Nowicki (disambiguation)
 Bartosz Nowicki (born 1984), Polish athlete
 Dolores Ashcroft-Nowicki (born 1929), British occult author
 Franciszek Nowicki (1864–1935), Polish poet and socialist activist
 Henryk Nowicki (1902–1969), known as Jerzy Zawieyski, Polish writer and activist
 Jan Nowicki (1939–2022), Polish actor
 Janet Nowicki (born 1953), American figure skater
 Jerzy Nowicki (1933–2013), Polish sport shooter
 Maciej Nowicki (born 1941), Polish politician
 Matthew Nowicki (1910–1950), Polish architect
 Maksymilian Nowicki (1826–1890), Polish zoologist
 Mieczysław Nowicki (born 1951), Polish road bicycle racer
 Tadeusz Nowicki (born 1946), Polish tennis player
 Wojciech Nowicki, Polish athlete

Nowicka may refer to:
 Danuta Nowicka (born 1951), Polish politician
 Joanna Nowicka (born 1966), Polish archer
 Julia Nowicka (born 1998), Polish volleyball player
 Katarzyna Nowicka (born 1974), known as Novika, Polish vocalist
 Patrycja Nowicka (born 1998), Polish vocalist
 Stanisława Nowicka (1905–1990), Polish dancer
 Wanda Nowicka (born 1956), Polish politician and activist

See also

References 

Polish-language surnames
Toponymic surnames